Edge routing may refer to:

 Routing a moulding on the edge of a piece of timber or other material.
 Network routing at the edge of a network (the routers concerned being called Edge routers):
 By use of an edge routing protocol such as EBGP,
 By other means.